Run to the Stars is a novel by Michael Scott Rohan published in 1982.

Plot summary
Run to the Stars is a novel in which the hero must overcome the corrupt government of Earth and escape.

Reception
Dave Langford reviewed Run to the Stars for White Dwarf #40, and stated that "Though slow-moving to begin with, and relying on a truly boggling coincidence at the climax, this is a superior SF adventure from an author I know well (bias declared) and whom I hate for getting a fanletter from Ursula Le Guin on his first published story."

Dave Pringle reviewed Run to the Stars for Imagine magazine, and stated that "At base it's a conventional SF scenario: muscular hero and sexy-but-brainy girlfriend escape from a bureaucratic Earth and make their romantic run to the stars. However, it is all done with marvellous bravura and the narrative fairly crackles with energy. 'Banzai! Arrigato!'"

Reviews
Review by Barry H. Reynolds (1986) in Fantasy Review, September 1986 
Review by Tom Easton (1986) in Analog Science Fiction/Science Fact, Mid-December 1986, (1986)

References

1982 novels